Jetzt Anders! was an Austrian band, put together by the Austrian casting show Starmania. Their music style is a mix of soul, pop and rock. They wanted to call the band Jetzt! ("Now!"), but there were already two other bands in Austria with that name, so they called the band Jetzt Anders! ("Now Different!"). Band member Tom Neuwirth would go on to win the Eurovision Song Contest 2014 as his drag persona Conchita Wurst.

Members 
Falco De Jong Luneau (born 7 August 1984)
 Thomas "Tom" Neuwirth (born 6 November 1988)
 Johannes "Johnny" Palmer (born 30 May 1984)
 Martin Zerza (born 27 October 1989)

Discography

Singles 
 Dieser Moment (single, 2007)

Albums 
 Gut So (album, 2007)

Austrian pop rock music groups
Starmania participants